Spartak Stadium may refer to the following stadia:

 In Belarus:
Spartak Stadium (Babruysk)
Spartak Stadium (Mahilyow)
 In Bulgaria:
 Spartak Stadium (Varna)
 In Kazakhstan:
 Spartak Stadium (Taldykorgan)
 In Kyrgyzstan:
 Spartak Stadium (Kyrgyzstan), in Bishkek
 In Russia:
 Spartak Stadium (Moscow)
 Spartak Stadium (Nalchik)
 Spartak Stadium (Novosibirsk)
 Spartak Stadium (Ryazan)
 Republican Spartak Stadium in Vladikavkaz
 In Ukraine:
 Spartak Stadium (Odessa), a stadium in Odessa
 Spartak Stadium, a stadium in Kharkiv
 Spartak Stadium, a stadium in Nizhyn
 Spartak Stadium, former name of Yuvileiny Stadium in Sumy
 Spartak Stadium, a stadium in Korosten
 Spartak Stadium, a stadium in Melitopol